Last-position memory is a feature that allows media playback devices to continue from where a user pauses the playback, or after powering off the device.

Early methods
Last-position memory dates back to the days of magnetic tape-based media.  For instance, open-reel tapes and cassette tapes automatically have this property since they automatically stay where they are when paused or stopped.  Indeed, tape-based media can be started and stopped and left at any point, and moved to any point, the only problem being that the further the point one wishes to move to in a recording, the longer it takes to get there. It is easy to go back and listen again to the last few seconds of a tape recording, e.g. to listen to something one could not hear properly. Some tapes such as 8-track tapes couldn't be re-wound, seeing as "looped" with a solenoid that shifted the tape to a spool aside of its endless loop.

Other early methods of "last-position memory" sometimes involved a user having to manually jot down a timecode of a program, such as a movie they were watching, in order to know where to continue from. Early DVD players didn't have last-position memory, and they also suffered from always starting back at the beginning after a disc had been ejected.

Computer-based devices
Some of the earliest instances of non-tape-based media playback devices to have "last-position memory" paired computer chips with media storage that didn't natively support it.  For instance, some CD players have last-position memory to the level of the playback device itself, as opposed to the storage medium; in which if a disc is ejected, it clears the memory buffer.

MP3 players also have last-position memory.  Typically this is to be found on mid- to high-end models of them.  Less expensive models of MP3 players sometimes only do last-position memory by knowing the file it's on without knowing the playback progress, and some lower-end models don't store last position memory at all.

Save-stating
Sometimes the effect of "last-position memory" can be emulated by savestating in virtual machines playing media playback software, such as VLC Media Player which doesn't natively support "last-position memory"

Computer memory
Digital audio players
Portable audio players
Portable media players